María Eugenia Nieto (born 15 January 1986 in Montevideo) is a Uruguayan beach volleyball player.

She is the first Uruguayan along with Fabiana Gómez to play a Beach Volleyball World Cup.

Results
Pan American Games
 2015: TBD

Beach Volleyball World Championships
 2015: 37th

FIVB Beach Volleyball World Tour
 Paraná Open 2014: 25th

References

External links
 Profile at FIVB
 Profile at Toronto 2015

Living people
1986 births
Uruguayan beach volleyball players
Women's beach volleyball players
Pan American Games competitors for Uruguay
Beach volleyball players at the 2015 Pan American Games